Rosanna Lisa Arquette (born August 10, 1959) is an American actress. She was nominated for an Emmy Award for her performance in the TV film The Executioner's Song (1982) and won the BAFTA Award for Best Actress in a Supporting Role for the film Desperately Seeking Susan (1985). Her other film roles include After Hours (also 1985), The Big Blue (1988), Pulp Fiction (1994), and Crash (1996). She also directed the documentary Searching for Debra Winger (2002) and starred in the ABC sitcom What About Brian? from 2006 to 2007.

Early life
Arquette was born in New York City on August 10, 1959, the daughter of Brenda Olivia "Mardi" (née Nowak), an actress, poet, theater operator, activist, acting teacher, and therapist, and Lewis Arquette, a film actor, screenwriter, and producer. Her paternal grandfather was comedian Cliff Arquette. Her mother was Jewish, from a family that emigrated from Poland and Russia. Her father, whose original family surname was "Arcouet", was of part-French-Canadian descent. Her father was a convert from Catholicism to Islam. Her siblings, Richmond, Patricia, Alexis, and David, all became actors as well.

Career
Arquette has appeared in both television and screen films. She earned an Emmy Award nomination for the TV film The Executioner's Song (1982). However, she was unhappy with the film's nude scene, remarking in an interview that the idea of the general public seeing her naked made her feel uncomfortable and exploited, and that most of the offers she had received since demanded that she similarly expose herself. Her first starring role was in John Sayles's film, Baby It's You (1983), highly regarded by Rotten Tomatoes reviewers but not widely distributed. She co-starred in Desperately Seeking Susan (1985) alongside pop singer Madonna, for which Arquette won a BAFTA Award for Best Actress in a Supporting Role despite appearing in the leading role. In an interview at the time, Arquette said "The two questions I hate the most are 'What was it like working with Madonna?' and 'Are you the Rosanna in the song "Rosanna"?'" Following the commercial and critical success of Lawrence Kasdan's Silverado (also 1985), the limited success of the Martin Scorsese film After Hours (also 1985) and the commercial flop 8 Million Ways to Die (1986), also a critical failure, she quit Hollywood to work in Europe, acting in Luc Besson's The Big Blue (1988). Director Martin Scorsese then offered her a part in his segment of New York Stories (1989).

Arquette's other movies of note are Pulp Fiction and the David Cronenberg film Crash and the Australian film Wendy Cracked a Walnut (1990, also known as …Almost). In 1990, she appeared on the cover and in a nude pictorial in Playboys September issue, although she said it was without her prior knowledge or consent.

In 2017 Arquette alleged (along with almost a hundred other women from the entertainment industry), that the then film producer Harvey Weinstein sexually harassed her, threatened her because of her refusal to enter his hotel room, and subsequently saw to it that she was paid less for Pulp Fiction, then no longer cast her in A-list lead roles because of her rejection of his quid pro quo sexual harassment proposition; Weinstein was convicted of sex offences in 2020. When news broke about Weinstein's sexual offending in October 2017, Arquette was one of the first actresses to speak openly about his misconduct, with Ronan Farrow for The New Yorker and The New York Timess Jodi Kantor. In the documentary Untouchable (2019) about Weinstein focusing on those who accused him of sexual abuse, Arquette, Paz de la Huerta, and Erika Rosenbaum were among those interviewed.

Arquette has expanded into directing, including the documentaries Searching for Debra Winger (2002) and All We Are Saying (2005); she also produced both projects. Arquette appeared in What About Brian as Nicole Varsi and in Showtime's The L Word as Cherie Jaffe. She also guest-starred in Malcolm in the Middle as a healer named Anita.

In 2009, she joined Fit Parent Magazine, founded by Craig Knight, as Editor at Large. Arquette starred in the 2011 French thriller The Divide, directed by Xavier Gens.

In an August 8, 2019 interview with TheWrap, Arquette said the FBI advised her to make her Twitter account private after online critics harassed her for tweeting that she had shame for being "white and privileged".

Personal life
Arquette dated Toto keyboardist Steve Porcaro in the 1980s. The song "Rosanna" was partly based on her though the song's writer David Paich stated it was not. She was romantically involved with Peter Gabriel for several years; his song "In Your Eyes" is said to be inspired by her. In August 2013, Arquette married her fourth husband, investment banker Todd Morgan, following a two-year engagement. Her previous marriages, to director Tony Greco, film composer James Newton Howard, and restaurateur John Sidel, had ended in divorce. She has one daughter, Zoe Bleu, with Sidel. Arquette has described her diet as "vegetarian for the most part". In August 2019, Arquette posted on Twitter "I'm sorry I was born white and privileged. It disgusts me. And I feel so much shame." She later claimed the FBI told her to lock her twitter due to the reaction she received after posting this sentiment. In January of 2022, Morgan filed for separation from Arquette after 8 years of marriage.

Philanthropy
In 2010, Rosanna Arquette became Goodwill Ambassador for The Womanity Foundation.

Filmography

Film

Television

Web

Awards and nominations

References

External links

 
 
 

1959 births
Living people
Actresses from Evanston, Illinois
Actresses from New York City
American film actresses
Film producers from New York (state)
American television actresses
American women film directors
Rosanna Arquette
Best Supporting Actress BAFTA Award winners
American people of French-Canadian descent
American people of Russian-Jewish descent
American people of Polish-Jewish descent
20th-century American actresses
21st-century American actresses
American women film producers
Film producers from Illinois
Jewish American actresses